Paul Vallely CMG is a British writer on religion, ethics, Africa and development issues. In his seminal 1990 book Bad Samaritans: First World Ethics and Third World Debt, he first coined the phrase that campaigners needed to move "from charity to justice" – a slogan that was taken up by Jubilee 2000 and Live 8.

He is a Senior Fellow at the Global Development Institute at the University of Manchester and is a lay Ecumenical Canon of the Anglican Manchester Cathedral and a member of the Cathedral Council. He was Visiting Professor in Public Ethics at the University of Chester until 2019.  He is a member of the Independent Commission into the Experience of Victims and Long-Term Prisoners chaired by the former Bishop of Liverpool, Rt Rev James Jones, who chaired the Hillsborough Independent Panel. He writes in the New York Times,  The Guardian, Sunday Times and in The Church Times.

His biography Pope Francis - Untying the Knots, published by Bloomsbury in 2013, has been translated into four other languages. It was greatly expanded in 2015, with nine additional chapters on the inner workings of the current papacy, as Pope Francis: The Struggle for the Soul of Catholicism. His latest book, a six-year 750-page study Philanthropy – from Aristotle to Zuckerberg, has been described by the Wall Street Journal as "a chronicle every bit as encyclopaedic as the title suggests".

Career
Vallely was correspondent for The Times in Ethiopia during the great famine of 1984/85. He was commended as International Reporter of the Year for his reports which Bob Geldof described as "vivid, intelligent, moving and brave". Vallely was one of the few correspondents to leave the easy air routes to the feeding camps and strike off across country to find out what was really going on, according to Paddy Coulter, then Head of Media for the aid agency Oxfam. He uncovered a number of scandals the Marxist government were trying to keep hidden, was pronounced "an enemy of the revolution", arrested by the secret police and expelled from the country. He subsequently reported from across Africa, and elsewhere, covering wars and events in 30 different countries across the globe.   In 1985 Vallely travelled with Bob Geldof across Africa to decide how to spend the £150m raised by Live Aid. He later ghost-wrote Geldof's autobiography, Is That It?.

He has worked for many British national newspapers including The Times, The Daily Telegraph, Sunday Correspondent, The Sunday Times (where he edited the News Review section), Independent on Sunday (where he was executive editor and then a weekly columnist) and The Independent where he was a leader-writer. Until April 2013 he was associate editor of  The Independent. He still writes about ethical, cultural and political issues in the Independent on Sunday. (He was once referred to by Peter Wilby in New Statesman as The Independent's "resident saint"). He is also a columnist for The Church Times. He is a director and trustee of The Tablet the second-oldest surviving weekly journal in Britain. As a freelance he has written for The Independent, Sunday Times, the Guardian, the New York Times, the Church Times and Tablet magazine.

Activism
Vallely returned from covering the famine in Ethiopia in 1985 troubled by the adverse conditions under which ordinary people lived. Having encountered, in country after country across sub-Saharan Africa, the same problems with skewed trading and financial relationship between poor countries and the industrialised nations – and the huge debts they had accrued to rich countries and multilateral bodies like the International Monetary Fund – he wrote a book entitled Bad Samaritans – First World Ethics and Third World Debt. The book set out to show that change was both a moral imperative and also in the self-interest of the rich nations. The book was described by Jonathan Porritt as “required reading for atheistic economists, economically ill-at-ease theologians and any thinking person in between”. In it Vallely coined the phrase “from charity to justice” to describe the change that was required in relations between the rich and the poor. The slogan was taken up by campaigners from Jubilee 2000 to Make Poverty History and Live 8.

Bob Geldof paid tribute to Vallely's influence in a lecture to the Bar Human Rights Committee Lecture, St. Paul’s Cathedral in which he said: "In his book Bad Samaritans of 1990 Paul Vallely wrote correctly: 'For all his skill as a populist Bob Geldof could not shift the agenda from one of charity to one of justice.” Well maybe after 20 years we’ve finally got there." The founders of Jubilee 2000, Martin Dent and Bill Peters, have also acknowledged being inspired by Vallely's book. The book's title was later borrowed for the 2007 text Bad Samaritans: Rich Nations, Poor Policies and the Threat to the Developing World by the economist Ha-Joon Chang which also argues that the current economic policies supported by the IMF and wealthy countries are hindering development and creating poverty.

In 2004/05 Vallely was co-author of the report of the Commission for Africa set up by the British prime minister, Tony Blair, of which Bob Geldof was a member. Vallely has chaired or been active in a number of prominent UK aid agencies, including Traidcraft, the Catholic Institute for International Relations (CIIR, later known as Progressio),  Christian Aid and CAFOD. He has been an adviser to the Catholic bishops of England and Wales and was the author of their reports "Catholic Social teaching and the Big Society" and A place of redemption: a Christian approach to punishment and prison. (Catholic Bishop's Conference of England & Wales, 2004).

Pope Francis
Paul Vallely's biography Pope Francis - Untying the Knots examined the allegations made against Pope Francis when he was Fr Jorge Mario Bergoglio, leader of the Jesuits in Argentina, during the "Dirty War" conducted by the Argentine military dictatorship in the 1970s and '80s. Vallely concluded that Bergoglio did not actively betray two Jesuit priests, Franz Jalics and Orlando Yorio, into the hands of a military death squad, as some critics had alleged. But he did conclude that with regard to the two priests "Bergoglio behaved recklessly and has been trying to atone for his behaviour ever since.". "Vallely produces evidence to show that Bergoglio, in those years, did set up an escape route for those escaping the military death squads which saved a significant number of people."

The book was highly acclaimed by reviewers. The Sunday Times described it as "head and shoulders above" other biographies. The Guardian described it as "riveting" and "tough-minded analysis". The Tablet said: "read this book forget the rest". The Jesuit magazine America Magazine described it as "meticulous". Thinking Faith, the online journal of the British Jesuits, said it was "a stroke of genius" describing it as "a contemporary biography with the cadences of a film script”. Reuters said: "Paul Vallely’s Untying the Knots fills the gaps left by ‘instant books’ on Pope Francis". The Times Literary Supplement pronounced the book to be "formidable". And The Economist said: "This book demonstrates that Pope Francis is a tougher, more complex figure than meets the eye. A turbulent life has given the pontiff a subtle sense of the realities of power, and the courage to act on it. Anybody who reads this book will eagerly await his next move."

Vallely's inaugural professorial lecture "How Pope Francis will change Catholic Social Teaching" was delivered at the University of Chester, in conjunction with the Chester Theological Society on 1 May 2015.

Philanthropy
Vallely's most recent work has been a six-year long study of the history of Western philanthropy, a survey of the subject from the Ancient Greeks and Hebrews to modern times. Philanthropy – from Aristotle to Zuckerberg examines the successes and failures of contemporary philanthropy, examines its claims and contradictions and asks whether philanthropy is compatible with modern democracy. It also consider the relationship of philanthropy to political power, the place of philanthropy in the global economy and the democratisation of philanthropy through crowdfunding and other new avenues. The book critiques the excessive utilitarianism of much modern philanthrocapitalism and explores alternative approaches in extended interviews with top philanthropists and leading thinkers – including the late Rabbi Lord Jonathan Sacks; Jonathan Ruffer; Naser Haghamed of the world’s biggest Muslim charity, Islamic Relief; John Studzinski, Archbishop Rowan Williams; Lord David Sainsbury; Sir Bob Geldof; Sir Trevor Pears; Rajiv Shah president of the Rockefeller Foundation; Ian Linden, formerly of the Tony Blair Faith Foundation; Sir Richard Branson; Chris Oecshli of the now spent-out Atlantic Philanthropies; Professor Ngaire Woods, Dean of Oxford’s Blavatnik School of Government; Patrick Gaspard, president of George Soros’s Open Society Foundations;  Baroness Eliza Manningham-Buller, chair of the Wellcome Foundation; and Sir Lenny Henry and Kevin Cahill of Comic Relief. The book has been well-received internationally with the Literary Review declaring it "as awesome in breadth as it is meticulous in detail". The New Yorker declared it a "highly readable survey" which "is helpful in framing the major questions about philanthropy".

Consultancy
Vallely is a consultant on business and organisational ethics.  His approach is rooted in Catholic Social Teaching, a rich ethical tradition which draws on 100 years of attempts by the Catholic church to find a third way between unregulated capitalism - and its associated political systems which privilege the individual at the expense of society - and those associated with control by the state which privilege society at the expense of the individual. In addition to private consultancy he lectures on organisational ethics and the social responsibility of the private sector. As a trustee of Traidcraft he was instrumental in the establishment of the Fairtrade Foundation. He was a founder member of the ethics committee of Waitrose supermarkets and advises John Lewis on human rights.

Honours and awards
Vallely was created a Companion of St Michael and St George (CMG) "for services to journalism and to the developing world" on 17 June 2006.

He is an Honorary Research Fellow in the School of Arts, Histories and Cultures at the University of Manchester.

In 2008 he was shortlisted for the Orwell Prize, the pre-eminent prize in Britain for political writing.

Publications
 With Geldof in Africa (with David Blundy), 1985;
 Is That It? (with Bob Geldof), 1986;
 Bad Samaritans: First World Ethics and Third World Debt, 1990;
 Promised Lands: Stories of Power and Poverty in the Third World, 1992;
 Daniel and the Mischief Boy (for children), 1993;
 The New Politics: Catholic Social Teaching for the 21st century, 1999;
 The Church and the New Age, 2000;
 Live Aid DVD sleeve notes 2004;
 A Place of Redemption: A Christian approach to Punishment and Prison (ed), 2004;
 The Fifth Crusade: George Bush and the Christianisation of the war in Iraq, 2004;
 Our Common Interest: report of the Prime Minister’s Commission for Africa (co-author) 2005;
 Live 8 Official Programme notes  2005;
 Live 8 DVD sleeve notes  2005;
 Geldof in Africa (with Bob Geldof), 2005;
 Hello World: the official Live 8 Book, 2005;
 "New Labour and the New World Order" in Remoralising Britain, 2008.
 Catholic Social Teaching and the Big Society, 2011
 Pope Francis: Untying the Knots, 2013
 Pope Francis: The Struggle for the Soul of Catholicism 2015
 Philanthropy – from Aristotle to Zuckerberg 2020

References

External links
 
 

British male journalists
Companions of the Order of St Michael and St George
Living people
People from Middlesbrough
1951 births